I Hope You're Happy Now may refer to:

 "I Hope You're Happy Now" (Elvis Costello song), 1986
 "I Hope You're Happy Now" (Carly Pearce and Lee Brice song), 2019